The 1930 Eureka Red Devis football team was an American football team that represented Eureka College in the Illinois Intercollegiate Athletic Conference (IIAC) during the 1930 college football season. In its 10th season under head coach Ralph McKinzie, the team compiled a 2–6 record. Ronald Reagan, who later served as the 40th President of the United States, was a lineman on the team.

Schedule

References

Eureka
Eureka Red Devils football seasons
Eureka Red Devils football